List of football clubs in Australia may refer to:

 List of Australian rules football clubs in Australia
 List of soccer clubs in Australia